Mollie Jepsen (born September 17, 1999) is a Canadian alpine skier.

Early life
Jepsen was born in West Vancouver, British Columbia without several fingers on her left hand. She learned to ski by the age of two and also took gymnastics classes. Growing up, she attended West Vancouver Secondary which she graduated from in 2017.

Career
She was influenced to start competitive skiing after watching the 2010 Winter Olympics and joined the Whistler Mountain Ski Club. However, when she was 13 she tore her right anterior cruciate ligament (ACL) and again when she was 15.

Despite this, she was selected to compete with Team Canada during the 2018–19 season. Upon returning to British Columbia after partaking in Team Canada's summer training camp in Chile, she was diagnosed with Crohn’s disease. She qualified for the 2018 Winter Paralympics in PyeongChang, South Korea, where she won her first gold medal in the super combined event. She also won a silver medal in the slalom and two bronze medals in downhill and giant slalom. 

She was named the Female Para-Alpine Athlete of the Year at the Audi 2018 Canadian Ski Racing Awards and the Best Female Athlete at the 2018 Canadian Paralympic Sport Awards.

She won Canada's first gold, the gold medal in the women's downhill standing event at the 2022 Winter Paralympics held in Beijing, China. She also won silver in the giant slalom and was honoured to be chosen to be Canada's flag carrier in the closing ceremonies.

References

External links 
 
 

1999 births
Living people
People from West Vancouver
Sportspeople from British Columbia
Paralympic gold medalists for Canada
Paralympic silver medalists for Canada
Paralympic bronze medalists for Canada
Medalists at the 2018 Winter Paralympics
Medalists at the 2022 Winter Paralympics
Canadian female alpine skiers
People with Crohn's disease
Paralympic alpine skiers of Canada
Paralympic medalists in alpine skiing
Alpine skiers at the 2018 Winter Paralympics
Alpine skiers at the 2022 Winter Paralympics
21st-century Canadian women